EGSA Alger or EGSA/Alger (which translates into English as: Airport Management Services Establishment of Algeria) is a government agency which operates 18 airports in Algeria.

EGSA Alger was created by presidential decree No. 173–87 on 11 August 1987. Under the supervision of the Algerian Ministry of Transportation, its mission is to manage, develop and operate Algerian airports open to public air traffic. It operates the following airports:

 Algiers – Houari Boumediene Airport
 Bejaia – Soummam Abane Ramdane Airport
 Hassi-Messaoud – Oued Irara Airport
 Ghardaïa – Noumerate Moufdi Zakaria Airport
 Tamanrasset – Aguenar - Hadj Bey Akhamokh Airport
 Ouargla – Ain Beida Airport
 In-Amenas – Zarzaitine Airport
 In Guezzam – In Guezzam Airport
 In Salah – Tafsaout Airport
 Laghouat – Moulay Ahmed Medeghri Airport
 Hassi R'Mel – Tilrhemt Airport
 El Oued – Guemar Airport
 Djanet – Tiska Airport
 Touggourt – Sidi Mahdi Airport
 El Goléa – El Menia Airport
 Bou Saâda – Ain Eddis Airport
 Chlef – Abou Bakr Belkaid Airport
 Illizi – Takhamalt Airport

See also

 List of airports in Algeria

References

External links
  Établissement de Gestion de Services Aéroportuaires d’Alger (EGSA Alger)

Aviation in Algeria
Government agencies of Algeria
1987 establishments in Algeria